Jeff Wheeland (born October 1957) is a member of the Pennsylvania House of Representatives, representing the 83rd House district in Lycoming County, Pennsylvania.

Political career 
Wheeland currently sits on the Appropriations, Liquor Control, Local Government, and State Government committees.

References

External links
Official Web Site
PA House profile

1957 births
21st-century American politicians
Living people
Republican Party members of the Pennsylvania House of Representatives
People from Lycoming County, Pennsylvania